Alypia mariposa, the mariposa forester, is a moth of the family Noctuidae. The species was first described by Augustus Radcliffe Grote and Coleman Townsend Robinson in 1868. It is found in Coast Ranges and Sierra foothills of California, from Kern and San Luis Obispo counties in the south to Placer County in the north.

It resembles Alypia ridingsii except it lacks black lines through the white wing spots. Adults fly in April, May and June.

The larvae have been recorded feeding on Clarkia bottae and Clarkia unguiculata.

References

External links

"Agaristinae New Genus 1 mariposa Alypia mariposa". Noctuidae of North America. Retrieved November 17, 2020.

Agaristinae
Moths of North America
Moths described in 1868